Order of Bishop Platon is Estonian award which is given by Estonian Apostolic Orthodox Church. The award is named after Estonian bishop Platon (Kulbusch). The award is established in 1922.

Recipients (selection)
Herman (Aav)
Andrei Jämsä
Endel Lippmaa
Indrek Pertelson
Konstantin Päts

References

Estonian awards
Awards established in 1922
1922 establishments in Estonia